Paul Cătălin Tincu (born 26 February 1986) is a retired Romanian professional footballer who played as a midfielder.

Club career

Tincu started playing football at the Noua Generaţie Iaşi club. He and teammate Clement Pălimaru signed with Liga I club Politehnica Iaşi during the 2004–05 season, after being considered the most promising players from the centre at that time. In the summer of 2010 he moved to Politehnica Iași, again alongside Clement Pălimaru.

International career

Tincu also played for the Romania under-21 football team. He appeared in four games and scored once, against Northern Ireland, in a 2–0 victory.

References

External links

1986 births
Living people
Romanian footballers
FC Politehnica Iași (1945) players
FC Politehnica Iași (2010) players
ACS Foresta Suceava players
CS Știința Miroslava players
F.C. Romania players
Liga I players
Association football midfielders